Graveyard of Empires  is the fourth studio album by Canadian rock band Evans Blue, released on April 17, 2012. The album has three singles, "This Time It's Different", "Halo", and "Beyond The Stars.

Track listing

Personnel
Evans Blue
Dan Chandler – vocals
Parker Lauzon – guitar
Vlad "V" Tanaskovic – guitar
Joe Pitter – bass

Additional musicians
 Mike McClure – drums
Jason Pierce – drums

Production
 Trevor Kustiak – producer
 Dan Korneff – mixing
 Ted Jensen – mastering

References

2012 albums
Evans Blue albums